Crishantha Dilan Perera Hettikankanamge (born 19 September 1978) is a Sri Lankan professional football referee. He has been a full international for FIFA since 2004. He refereed some matches in AFC Champions League.

AFC Asian Cup

References 

1978 births
Living people
Sri Lankan football referees
AFC Asian Cup referees